Jeotgalibacillus alkaliphilus is a Gram-positive, rod-shaped  and non-motile bacterium from the genus of Jeotgalibacillus which has been isolated from a solar salt pan.

References

External links
Type strain of Jeotgalibacillus alkaliphilus at BacDive -  the Bacterial Diversity Metadatabase

Bacillales
Bacteria described in 2016